Araiofusus is a genus of sea snails, marine gastropod mollusks in the family Fasciolariidae, the spindle snails, the tulip snails and their allies.

Species
Species within the genus Araiofusus include:
 Araiofusus araios Callomon & Snyder, 2017
 Araiofusus colpoicus (Dall, 1915)
 Araiofusus eueides Callomon & Snyder, 2017

References

External links
 Callomon P. & Snyder M.A. (2017). A new genus and nine new species in the Fasciolariidae (Gastropoda: Buccinoidea) from southern California and western Mexico. Proceedings of the Academy of Natural Sciences of Philadelphia. 165(1): 55-80

Fasciolariidae